Lappohja is a village located in the municipality of Hanko. It has a population of about 475 (2016).

The Lappohja railway station is located along the Karis–Hanko railway.

References

Hanko
Villages in Finland